Ricardo José Cardeño Restrepo (born January 8, 1971 in Medellín) is a triathlete from Colombia who won the 2005 Pan American Triathlon Championships, and who has represented his native country three times at the Pan American Games: 1995, 1999 and 2007. Cardeno has competed at the international level since 1991. He won the 2002 and 2007 Pan American Duathlon Championships in Colombia.

External links 
 Profile

1971 births
Living people
Colombian male triathletes
Triathletes at the 1995 Pan American Games
Triathletes at the 1999 Pan American Games
Triathletes at the 2007 Pan American Games
Sportspeople from Medellín
Pan American Games competitors for Colombia
20th-century Colombian people
21st-century Colombian people